Footballer of the Year in Baltic and Commonwealth of Independent States (also known as the "Star award") was an annual award given by Sport-Express daily to the Baltic and Commonwealth of Independent States player of the season from 2004 to 2013. The title is awarded according to the results of a poll conducted by the newspaper.

Winners

Wins by player

See also 
 Soviet Footballer of the Year
 Footballer of the Year in Russia (Sport-Express) - "Sport Express" daily sports newspaper version.
 Footballer of the Year in Russia (Futbol) - "Futbol" weekly magazine version.

References 
 Official page 
 Sport-Express 

  

Baltic
Awards by newspapers
Awards established in 2004
Sport in the Baltic states
Russian football trophies and awards